The East Brazilian pygmy owl (Glaucidium minutissimum), also known as least pygmy-owl or Sick's pygmy-owl, is a small owl in the typical owl family.

Taxonomy
It has been argued that the scientific name used here actually belongs to the Pernambuco pygmy owl, in which case the East Brazilian pygmy owl should be referred to as G. sicki (König & Weick, 2005). This has not gained widespread recognition.

Formerly, this species included the Colima pygmy owl, Tamaulipas pygmy owl, Central American pygmy owl, subtropical pygmy owl, and Baja pygmy owl as subspecies.

Distribution
This species has a large range. It can be found in southeastern Brazil and easternmost Paraguay.

Habitat 

It inhabits tropical and subtropical moist evergreen forests and edges as well as open bush canopy.

Description 
The head is rounded, with no ear tufts. The pale greyish-brown facial disk is not pronounced and shows some rufous concentric lines. The eyes are yellow, with whitish eyebrows. The upper part of the body is relatively dark, rufous-brown with small white spots. Wings are dark brown and relatively short. The tail is dark brown with five pale bars. The lower part of the body is light gray or white, with reddish-brown stripes. The throat shows a rounded whitish area. The legs are feathered, with bristled and yellowish toes. Claws are horn-colored with dark tips. The beak is yellow-green.

Biology
The East Brazilian pygmy owl mainly feeds on small insects and sometimes catches small vertebrates. It is active at dusk and dawn, but occasionally hunts during the day. The song of the male is two to four long notes separated by short pauses.

References

East Brazilian pygmy owl
Birds of the Atlantic Forest
East Brazilian pygmy owl
Taxonomy articles created by Polbot